Albert King (1923–1992) was an American blues musician.

Albert King may also refer to:

Albert King (basketball) (born 1959), retired American basketball player
Albert Freeman Africanus King (1841–1914), English-American physician called to duty during the assassination of Abraham Lincoln
Bertie King (1912–1981), Jamaican jazz and mento musician
Albert King (umpire) (1878–1946), South African cricket umpire
Albert King, a fictional character and boss in the video game Batman: Arkham Knight

See also

Bert King (disambiguation)